The Bandit Queen is a 1950 American Western film directed by William Berke. and starring Barbara Britton, Willard Parker and Phillip Reed. as the leaders of a Robin Hood type band.

Plot
Zarra Montalvo is the daughter of an American father and Spanish mother, Don Jose  (Victor Kilian) and Zara Montalvo (Cecil Weston, credited as Cecile Weston). The Montalvo family possesses land rights or Spanish land grants to a hacienda with gold mines present. Abroad, Zarra comes home to California and witnesses her parents being murdered by Hank (John Merton) and an unknown man, Sheriff Jim Harden (Barton MacLane). Zarra initially approaches Harden about the crimes but eventually recognizes him as part of the murderers' gang. She joins forces with Joaquin Murietta (Phillip Reed) to regain her rightful inheritance, and together they assume secret identities, with Zarra hidden behind the alias of a Zorro-like character named "Lola Belmont" and Murietta as "Carlos del Rio".

Dan Hinsdale (Willard Parker), an attorney, later informs Zarra about his purchase of her family's rancho at a reduced fee because of back taxes owed by Zarra's parents. Zarra seeks the aid of Father Antonio (Martin Garralaga), who along with Murietta is one of the few people to know their dual identities. Father Antonio warns her that her outlaw gang is wanted by the Spanish authority and its soldiers. Upon learning this, "Belmont" and "del Rio" secretly work to regain stolen gold and "land rights" on the behalf of other neighboring rancheros.

Cast
 Barbara Britton as Zara Montalvo aka Lola Belmont
 Willard Parker as Dan Hinsdale
 Phillip Reed as Joaquin Murietta 
 Barton MacLane as Jim Harden
 Martin Garralaga as Father Antonio
 Victor Kilian as Jose Montalvo
 Thurston Hall as Governor
 Angelo Rossitto as Nino (as Angie)
 Anna Demetrio as Maria
 Paul Marion as Manuel 
 Mikel Conrad as Captain Gray (as Mike Conard)
 Margia Dean as Carol Grayson
 Minna Phillips as Mrs. Grayson
 John Merton as Hank

Production
Britton was coached for the film by Marcella Cresney. The film's sets were designed by the art director Vin Taylor.

The Bandit Queen was produced by Lippert Pictures and shot in the Vasquez Rocks Natural Area Park as well as the San Fernando Valley. Set near Madera, California during the California Gold Rush, The Bandit Queen is a 70 minute black-and-white movie that was a serial film depiction of Joaquin Murrieta's life. Martha Vickers was initially slated to "play a two-gun gal of the West in her come-back picture" in this movie. This release marked the final "Lippert Studios" film in 1950 with Britton starring in the title role as a Spanish American aristocratic daughter who avenged her parents' deaths in recovering stolen wealth through the use of a bullwhip.

Reception

Critical
The Bandit Queen received the following reviews:

- The Baltimore Afro-American, April 21, 1951.

- The Modesto Bee, February 8, 1959.

- Southeast Missourian, March 22, 1951.

- Times-News (Hendersonville, North Carolina)'', January 29, 1951.

See also
 1950 in film
 Cinema of the United States
 Lady Robinhood
 List of American films of 1950
 Queen of Swords (TV series)
 Senorita (film)
 Zorro's Black Whip

References

External links
 
 

1950 films
1950 Western (genre) films
American Western (genre) films
Films set in California
American black-and-white films
Films directed by William A. Berke
Films scored by Albert Glasser
Lippert Pictures films
Films about the caste system in India
1950s English-language films
1950s American films